Manitou Raven is a fictional character and superhero from DC Comics, who first appeared in JLA #66 (July 2002).

Manitou Raven was known to shout "Inukchuk!" when he cast spells. This is a reference by writer Joe Kelly to Apache Chief from the Super Friends animated series. Like Apache Chief, Manitou would shout this phrase in order to grow to enormous size. A sign in JLA #67 which read "Apache Land" gave the first clue to Manitou Raven's link to Apache Chief. Despite the intent of the reference, however, "Manitou" is an Algonquian word, not Apache.

Fictional character biography
Manitou Raven and his wife Dawn hail from the Obsidian Age of Atlantis, circa 1000 BC. They were born in North America, from a tribe which would one day become the Apache Tribe. Few details are known about Raven's early life. It is also unclear whether his command of mystical forces was learned or innate. Raven was recruited by the rulers of Atlantis—Rama Khan and Gamemnae—to join heroes from across the globe (and from rival societies) and form a multicultural "League of Ancients".

When Gamemnae had a prophetic vision of a "seven-headed hydra" from the future that would threaten Atlantis, Raven and a super-powered Aztec warrior called Tezumak journeyed to the 21st century to battle the threat. While there, they concluded that the "hydra" was the Justice League, but they were unable to defeat the League and barely managed to return to Atlantis to alert the Ancients that the JLA were en route. The JLA ultimately traveled back to the Ancients' time and were slain. During the fight, Raven witnessed Green Lantern Kyle Rayner's bravery; Rayner turned his attention from the fight to save innocent Atlanteans simply because they were in danger, even after they had shown him and his friends nothing but fear. Raven also tested Batman with his father's tomahawk, which has an enchantment that prevents it from piercing the skin of a good man. These events caused Raven to question the prophecy condemning the Justice League. Confronting Gamemnae, he learned that her vision was a lie; an Atlantean outcast, she had raised the city to the surface and restored the inhabitants' ability to breathe air with the intention of turning them into a world-conquering empire with herself as ruler, but when Aquaman and his people arrived from the future, she learned that her plans were destined to fail, and resolved to kill the Justice League when they came to rescue Aquaman in order to prevent their future.

Using Rayner's heart (Kyle having willingly sacrificed himself for the plan to work) and the souls of the slain JLA members, Raven cast a powerful containment spell around Atlantis that effectively trapped the evil Gamemnae. Eventually another team of Leaguers - consisting of Nightwing, Zatanna, Firestorm and Hawkgirl - arrived from the future, helping Aquaman to sink Atlantis to disrupt Gamemnae's bond with the city in the past, while the other League members in the future- the future Raven, Green Arrow, the Atom, Jason Blood, Major Disaster, Garth, and Faith - vanquished Gamemnae by tricking her into resurrecting the original League (Raven had reanimated them as corpses to fight the flesh-absorbing Gamemnae, forcing Gamemnae to bring them back to life so she could effectively kill them). Afterwards, with his alternate future self having sacrificed himself to defeat Gamemnae, the past versions of Raven and Dawn chose to accompany the Justice League and the returning Atlanteans into the future. Following this, Jason Blood left the JLA and suggested Manitou Raven as his replacement. Superman formally admitted him soon thereafter.

Being a man over three thousand years out of time, Raven suffered from culture shock, but eventually grew accustomed to the 21st century, respecting the Justice League as warriors and friends; he even told Aquaman that the League were the bravest people he had ever met. His powerful command of magic played an important role during his time on the team; most notably, when the League faced the Burning, an enraged Burning Martian unleashed when J'onn J'onzz broke his genetic lock against fire and unlocked his racial memories of the ancient Martians, he led teammates Major Disaster and the Atom on a spiritual walk to make contact with the Manhunter's true self on the spiritual plane. Meanwhile, the Manitou continued to immerse himself in his work. He even visited a reservation casino built on what was once his tribe's land. Its location was not specified, but he called it gontee ni, "ground of four fingers".

Justice League Elite
Both he and Dawn were eventually recruited into the Justice League Elite by Vera Black, who approached the JLA with a proposition. It seemed that a powerful chaos was emanating from the Earth's very being. The mother goddess, Gaea, was awakening and in her anger she threatened to destroy humanity. Though Superman was understandably hesitant to ally with Vera's new Elite, Raven confirmed Vera's prophesies. The JLA and the Elite subsequently staged an elaborate battle and convinced Gaea that humans were worthy of inheriting the planet.

After this, Vera boldly proposed the formation of the Justice League Elite: a black ops team organized to fight extranormal threats before they reach the public. Superman and Batman denied Vera membership in the League, which angered several of their teammates, including Raven, the Flash and Major Disaster, who all believed that Black had proved herself worthy. These members left the main JLA and allied with her in this new venture. Thus the Justice League Elite became a sort of "not-exactly-sanctioned don't-ask-don't-tell" covert operations unit. Their mission was to hunt and eliminate extranormal threats to the Earth before they went public.

This new undercover branch of the League moved to a secret base in New Jersey called The Factory. In their first mission, they infiltrated an organization of assassins that led to the takedown of the despotic dictator, Hi-Shan Bhat. Once Bhat in custody he was mysteriously killed by a member of the Elite. Vera knew this bode poorly for their future; upon their return, she charged Raven with divining the identity of the team's traitor/Bhat's killer. During this time, Dawn became distanced from her husband. His constant attention to work and the trials of the "Stony Path" kept him from satisfying her needs. Dawn became friendly with Green Arrow, who had vowed to quit the team because of Bhat's death. Soon the two engaged in a sexual relationship — not unbeknownst to Raven. Raven was angered of course, but consumed by his work. He acquired the "Eye of 18 Pupils" in order to divine the truth behind Bhat's death.

But before Raven could reveal the team's killer, he followed them in pursuit of the villain Aftermath. There Raven invoked his magic one last time and died taking the brunt of a bomb. This would not be the last heard from such a powerful magician. Just after his death, Raven appeared to several members of the Elite. His spirit convinced Major Disaster (who felt responsible for Raven's death) to seek treatment for alcoholism. Dawn entrusted Raven's hatchet to the Elite's coordinator, Naif al-Sheikh. Then in grief and anger, she too summoned Raven's spirit via the staff and uttered his magic phrase "Inukchuk!"

It was Raven who implored the Elite to regroup when all seemed lost. Dawn then assumed Manitou Raven's mantle of power (now Manitou Dawn), and she was permanently marked on the face by his spectral touch. During the Elite's final battle, Manitou Raven appeared in both the form of a Raven and as a phantom version of his former self. So far, Raven has remained close to Dawn, in a spiritual form, acting as an unpredictable advisor.

Powers and abilities
Manitou Raven is an expert magic user.

Equipment
Manitou Raven wields a cleaved staff.

References

DC Comics fantasy characters
DC Comics superheroes
DC Comics male superheroes
DC Comics characters who use magic
Comics characters introduced in 2002
Characters created by Joe Kelly
Fictional Apache people
Fictional characters who can change size